Linda Tuero (born October 21, 1950) is an American tennis player and paleoanthropologist. She won six U.S Junior Titles and three U.S. Women's Titles. She reached the quarter-finals of the French Open in 1971, and won the singles titles at the Italian Open in 1972. She represented the United States in the Wightman Cup and Federation Cup teams in 1972 and 1973 and served as the Federation Cup Captain in 1973. Tuero was ranked in the U.S. Top Ten Women Singles for four years and in 1972 was ranked No. 10 in the World.

Biography

Linda Tuero was born in Metairie, Louisiana. She started playing tennis at the age of 11 and was taught by the legendary tennis coach Emmett Paré from the very start and throughout her career. At age 13, she won the US National Girl's 14 Singles Championship and by the time she had graduated from high school, she had won six national titles: the 1964 US National Girl's 14 Singles Championship, the 1966 US National Girl's 16 Singles Championship, the 1966 US National Girl's 16 Doubles Championship, the 1967 US National Girl's 18 Clay Court Singles Championship, the 1968 US National Girl's 18 Clay Court Singles Championship, and the 1968 National Interscholastic Championship.

Tuero was the first woman to be awarded an athletic scholarship to Tulane University, the first woman to play on a Tulane varsity team, and the first woman to win a varsity Green Wave letter.

While a member of the Tulane tennis team, she played on the women's professional tennis circuit but kept her amateur status.  During this time she won three more national titles: the 1969 US Amateur Championship, 1970 US Amateur Championship and the 1970 US Open Clay Court Championship. In 1971 she was runner-up in the US Open Clay Courts, losing to Billie Jean King in the finals. During 1971 she also reached the quarterfinals of the French Open.

In 1971, while pursuing an active tennis career, she graduated cum laude from Tulane with a major in psychology.

In 1972, playing her first year as a professional, Linda won the Italian Open. She also won the first International Tournament of Madrid (Madrid Open) and was a semifinalist in the US Open Clay Courts, Canadian Open, WTA German Open, and Western & Southern Open (Cincinnati Masters), with losses to Chris Evert, Evonne Goolagong, and Margaret Smith Court. In 1973 she had a win over Martina Navratilova in the Fort Lauderdale Classic.

Tuero represented the US in the Wightman Cup and Federation Cup teams in 1972 and 1973, serving as the Federation Cup Captain in 1973

Her top career world rankings included No 1 in Women-Under-21 and No 10 in World (Women). She has been inducted into the Halls of Fame of Tulane University, Louisiana Tennis Tennis Hall of Fame, and USTA Southern Tennis Hall of Fame.

Personal life 
In 1968 she graduated from St. Martin's Episcopal School in Metairie, Louisiana. In 1971, she graduated cum laude from Tulane with a major in psychology.

In 1973, while working as an extra in The Exorcist, she met the author, William Peter Blatty. They were married in July 1975 and had two children, restaurant entrepreneur Billy and photojournalist J.T. Blatty. She also appeared in another film, The Ninth Configuration, which he wrote. 

After her divorce from Blatty, she married William Paul. She had another son during this marriage. She is now married to Dr. William Lindsley who is a former business consultant and former dean and professor at Boston College, Vanderbilt University Owen School of Management, and Belmont University Graduate School of Business.

In 2000, Tuero enrolled in the Tulane Graduate School and in 2004 graduated with a master's degree in anthropology, specializing in the field of paleoanthropology. In 2005, she was part of a Rutgers excavation in the Lake Turkana region of northern Kenya. Her passions include golf, paleontology, and world travel. She makes frequent trips collecting fossils and enjoys identifying and scientifically cataloging her extensive collection.

Career finals

Singles (5 titles, 6 runners-up)

Career highlights

As an Amateur:

 Winner, 1964 US National Championships - Girl's 14 Singles
 Winner, 1966 US National Championships - Girl's 16 Singles and Doubles
 Winner, 1967 and 1968 US National Clay Court Singles Championships - Girl's 18
 Finalist, 1968 US Grass Court Women's Singles
 Winner, 1968 National Interscholastic Championship
 Finalist, 1968 US Open Clay Court Women's Singles (to Nancy Richey)
 Finalist, 1969 US Open Clay Court Women's Doubles
 Winner, 1969 and 1970 US Amateur Championship
 Finalist, 1969 US Amateur Mixed Doubles
 Quarter-finalist, 1969 Western & Southern Open (to Gail Chanfreau)
 Semi-finalist, 1970 Canadian Open Women's Singles (to Rosemary Casals)
 Semi-finalist, 1970 Western & Southern Open Wonmen's Singles (to Nancy Richey)
 Winner, 1970 US Women's Amateur Singles
 Finalist, 1970 Women's Collegiate Women's Singles

As a Professional:

 Finalist, 1971 US Open Clay Courts Women's Doubles
 Quarter-finalist, 1971 French Open (to Marijke Schaar)
 Quarter-finalist, 1971 Western & Southern Open (Cincinnati Masters) Women's Singles (to Evonne Goolagong)
 Semi-finalist, 1972 US Open Clay Court Women's Singles (to Evonne Goolagong)
 Semi-finalist, 1972 Canadian Open Women's Singles (to Evonne Goolagong)
 Semi-finalist, 1972 Western Open Women's Singles (to Margaret Court)
 Finalist, 1972 Nice Women's Singles
 Semi-finalist, 1972 Eastern Grass Court Open Women's Singles
 Finalist, 1972 Western Province South Africa Women's Singles
 Winner, 1972 Wightman Cup
 Semi-finalist, 1972 Federation Cup (to Johannesburg)
 Runner-up, 1972 Bonne Bell Cup against Australia
 Semi-finalist, 1973 Fort Lauderdale (to Chris Evert)
 Semi-finalist, 1973 Western (to Margaret Court)
 Semi-finalist, 1971 Baastad Open (to Benzer)
 Finalist, 1973 Marie O. Clark (to Chris Evert)
 Captain, 1973 Federation Cup
 Winner, 1973 Wightman Cup
 Finalist, 1973 Cleveland Heights Women's Singles
 Semi-finalist, 1973 US Open Clay Courts Women's Singles (to Chris Evert)

Awards and honors

 Inducted into the USTA Southern Tennis Hall of Fame in 1995
 Louisiana Tennis Hall of Fame | Patrons Foundation
 Ranked in Women's US Top 10 Women's four times (1968 : No. 8, 1969 : No. 10, 1971 : No. 8, 1972 : No. 7)
 Inducted into Tulane Athletic Hall Of Fame  (1969-1971)
 Tulane Scholarship for Men's tennis Team
 1968 VFW Athlete of the Year New Orleans
 1969 VFW Athlete of the Year New Orleans
 1969 Louisiana Outstanding Athlete of the Year
 1970 VFW Athlete of the Year New Orleans

Articles
 Linda Tuero Captures Girls Tennis Crown
 ONLY At Tulane "Tradition - Tulane Tennis Legend Linda Tuero"
 A First At Tulane
 New Orleans Yesterday and Today: A Guide to the City
 The Right Set: A Tennis Anthology
 40 Years Ago In Tennis – Bud Collins Summarizes The Epic Year
 1973 US Wightman Cup Team

References

External links

 
 
 

1950 births
Living people
American female tennis players
Tennis people from Louisiana
Tulane Green Wave women's tennis players
People from Metairie, Louisiana
Sportspeople from Savannah, Georgia
Sportspeople from New Orleans